Pultenaea tenuifolia, commonly known as slender bush-pea, is a species of flowering plant in the family Fabaceae and is endemic to southern Australia. It is a spreading or low-lying to prostrate and mat-forming shrub with hairy branches, narrow lance-shaped leaves, and yellow to orange and red, pea-like flowers.

Description
The leaves are channelled on the upper surface and often clustered. Flowering occurs from August to December and the fruit is a hairy, egg-shaped pod.

Taxonomy
Pultenaea tenuifolia was first formally described in 1819 by John Sims in Curtis's Botanical Magazine from an unpublished description by Robert Brown of a specimen cultivated in England. The specific epithet (tenuifolia) means "thin-leaved".

Distribution and habitat
Slender bush-pea is found in Western Australia, South Australia, Victoria and Tasmania. In Western Australia it grows in near-coastal areas in the Esperance Plains, Jarrah Forest and Warren biogeographic regions and in South Australia from the Eyre Peninsula to the Victorian border. In Victoria it occurs on coastal sand dunes and on the calcareous soils of the Little and Big Deserts. The species is found on granite in north-eastern Tasmania.

References

tenuifolia
Fabales of Australia
Flora of New South Wales
Flora of South Australia
Flora of Tasmania
Flora of Victoria (Australia)
Flora of Western Australia
Plants described in 1819
Taxa named by John Sims (taxonomist)